McCarley is an unincorporated community located in Carroll County, Mississippi, United States, approximately  west of Winona and approximately  east of North Carrollton. McCarley is part of the Greenwood, Mississippi micropolitan area.

Although unincorporated, McCarley has a post office and a ZIP code of 38943.

McCarley is located on the former Southern Railway.

A post office first began operation under the name McCarley in 1890.

References

Unincorporated communities in Carroll County, Mississippi
Unincorporated communities in Mississippi